Nanny Larsén-Todsen (2 August 1884 – 26 May 1982) was a Swedish soprano, renowned for her performances in works by Richard Wagner and counted as one of the most notable Wagnerian sopranos of the 20th-century, from the generation before Frida Leider and Kirsten Flagstad. She was particularly popular at the Bayreuth Festival as Brunnhilde and Isolde.

Active at the Royal Swedish Opera 1906–25, at La Scala 1923–24, the Metropolitan Opera 1925–27, and Bayreuth in 1927–31, she also made guest appearances at most of the major European opera houses. Her last appearance was at the Paris Opera in 1937, as Isolde. She received Litteris et Artibus in 1920, was elected into the Royal Swedish Academy of Music in 1924, and made Hovsångerska in 1925.

Living in Stockholm following her retirement from the stage, Larsén-Todsen taught singing.

Recordings
1928: Wagner, Richard: Tristan und Isolde (abridged); Nanny Larsen-Todsen (as Isolde), with Anny Helm (Brangäne), Gunnar Graarud (Tristan), Rudolf Bockelmann (Kurwenal], Ivar Andrésen (König Marke), Joachim Sattler (Melot), Gustav Rodin (Ein junger Seemann), and Hans Beer (Ein Hirt). Bayreuth Festival Orchestra & Chorus, conducted by Karl Elmendorff. Originally issued by Columbia EMI in 1929 on 20 discs (Columbia GOX 10532-10551), this was recorded (without audience) in the Bayreuth Festspielhaus with the approval of Siegfried Wagner during the late summer of 1928.

There were several CD reissues: Naxos CD 8.110200-02 (3 CDs) | Grammofono 2000 AB 78925-26 (2 CDs) | Preiser PSR 90383 (2 CDs)

References

Barometern, 1 August 1974.
 Göransson, Roland, "Hagbyflickan som blev firad operastjärna", 1999 Södermörekrönikan. Kalmar: Södermöre hembygdsförening. 1987– . Libris 662,229.
 Sohlmans musiklexikon (The Sohlman Music Dictionary) 
 Warrack, John and West, Ewan (1992), The Oxford Dictionary of Opera, 782 pages,

External links

Postcard portrait of Nanny Larsen-Todsen

1884 births
1982 deaths
Swedish operatic sopranos
Members of the Royal Swedish Academy of Music
Litteris et Artibus recipients
20th-century Swedish women  opera singers